Youngpa Girl's High School(英波女子高等學校)is located in Seoul Songpa-gu Pungnap-dong  General Private Girl's  High School.

History of School
 1967 March 20 : Established by Educational Foundation「Academy of Youngpa」
 1972 December 2 : Youngpa Girl's General High school (total 15 classes)
 1973 October 29 : Changing name(General High School → Academic High School)
 1976 January 18 : The First Graduation Ceremony
 1979 December 30  : High School Rebuilding(Basement, 5th floor)
 1982 November 10 : Class and Auditorium Extension
 2001 March 2 : From Freshman reduction classes to 21 classes
 2002 March 2 : From Freshman reduction classes to 20 classes
 2003 March 2 : From Freshman reduction classes to 18 classes

References

High schools in Seoul
Girls' schools in South Korea
Educational institutions established in 1967